The  is a Japanese railway line connecting Kiyama Station (on the Kagoshima Main Line), Kiyama and Amagi Station, Asakura. This is the only railway line  operates. The company or the line is also called  locally. The line functions as a commuter rail line for Fukuoka. The Kirin Brewery Co. is a shareholder of the company as a result of the former approximately 1 km siding from Tachiarai that serviced its nearby brewery.

Stations

History
The line was opened on April 28, 1939 by the Japanese National Railways (JNR) as the Amagi Line, in order to supply military equipment to Tachiarai Airfield. In 1981, the line was named a specified local line and considered for closure. Freight services ceased in 1984. 

On April 5, 1985, it was agreed that the line would be transferred to a newly-created third sector railway company. Amagi Railway was thus created and inherited the former JNR line on April 1, 1986. 

Heavy rainfall damaged a bridge between Oitai and Matsuzaki in 2006 and buses provided the link between those two station for six months until the bridge was repaired.

See also
 List of railway companies in Japan
 List of railway lines in Japan

References

External links 
 
  

Railway lines in Japan
Rail transport in Fukuoka Prefecture
Rail transport in Saga Prefecture
Railway lines opened in 1986
1067 mm gauge railways in Japan
Japanese third-sector railway lines